The Crete Ladies Open was a women's professional golf tournament on the LET Access Series, held between 2012 and 2014 in Crete, Greece.

The tournament was played at Crete Golf Club, the only 18-hole golf course on Crete, the largest and most populous of the Greek Islands and the second largest in the eastern Mediterranean Sea. The inaugural tournament saw the first two days cancelled due to strong winds reaching 77 miles per hour. Austrian Christine Wolf took the title on the first play-off hole. Tonje Daffinrud secured promotion to the Ladies European Tour with her win in 2014.

Winners

References

External links

LET Access Series events
Golf tournaments in Greece